Salomo "Salomon" Könönen (8 June 1916 – 21 February 1979) was a Finnish long-distance runner. He competed in the 10000 m event at the 1948 Summer Olympics and finished ninth.

References

1916 births
1979 deaths
People from Suonenjoki
People from Kuopio Province (Grand Duchy of Finland)
Finnish male long-distance runners
Olympic athletes of Finland
Athletes (track and field) at the 1948 Summer Olympics
Sportspeople from North Savo